David Mark Morrell (born October 8, 1971) is a former cricketer.  Morrell was a right-handed batsman who fielded as a wicket-keeper.  He was born in Newport, Isle of Wight.

Morrell made his debut for Norfolk in the 1991 Minor Counties Championship against Bedfordshire.  Morrell played Minor counties cricket for Norfolk from 1991 to 1992, which included 8 Minor Counties Championship matches and 2 MCCA Knockout Trophy matches.   He made his only List A appearance against Leicestershire in the 1992 NatWest Trophy.  In this match, he scored 6 runs before being dismissed by Justin Benson.

References

External links
David Morrell at ESPNcricinfo
David Morrell at CricketArchive

1971 births
Living people
People from Newport, Isle of Wight
Welsh cricketers
Norfolk cricketers